Simon Kennefick (born 1999) is an Irish hurler who plays as a forward for club side Glen Rovers and at inter-county level with the Cork senior hurling team. He is a grandson of Christy Ring.

Career

Glen Rovers

Kennefick joined the Glen Rovers club at a young age and played in all levels at juvenile and underage levels. It was the club with whom his grandfather, Christy Ring, won a record 14 championship titles. Kennefick had his first championship success at minor level when Glen Rovers secured the 2017 Premier 1 Championship title after a 0-19 to 1-11 defeat of Midleton in the final. He was subsequently drafted onto the Glen Rovers senior team and made his championship debut on 28 April 2018 when he scored 1-03 in a first round defeat of Ballymartle. Kennefick lined out in three successive county finals over the following three seasons, experiencing defeats to Imokilly in 2019, Blackrock in 2020 and Midleton in 2021.

Cork

Under-21 and under-20

Kennefick never played at minor level for Cork, but was drafted onto the under-21 team in 2018. He was a member of the extended training panel when Cork secured the Munster Championship title after 2-23 to 1-13 defeat of Tipperary in the final. He was again eligible for the now renamed under-20 grade the following year and made his first appearance at right wing-forward in a 1-20 to 0-16 first-round defeat of Limerick.  On 24 August 2019, Kennefick was a late addition to the Cork starting fifteen that suffered a 5-17 to 1-18 defeat by Tipperary in the All-Ireland final.

Senior

Kennefick made his first appearance for Cork at senior level when he was selected on the team at right wing-forward for the annual Canon O'Brien Cup game against University College Cork in January 2019. He scored four points from play in the 1-24 to 1-23 victory but was not included on the Cork panel for the rest of the season. 

In May 2021, Kennefick received his first competitive call-up at senior level when he was named amongst the substitutes for Cork's National League game against Westmeath.

Career statistics

Club

Inter-county

Honours

Glen Rovers
Premier 1 Minor Hurling Championship: 2017

Cork
Canon O'Brien Cup: 2019
Munster Under-21 Hurling Championship: 2018

References

1999 births
Living people
Glen Rovers hurlers
Cork inter-county hurlers
Hurling forwards